Munsbach Castle is located to the southwest of Munsbach near Schuttrange in central Luxembourg. It now belongs to the Institut Universitaire International Luxembourg which provides educational courses in business, European law and public sector management.

The castle also hosts the European University Foundation - Campus Europae network of universities, which promotes European citizenship and multilingualism though student exchange and academic cooperation.

The castle is a residence in the Baroque style built in 1775. It has two towers and a number of dependent buildings.

See also
List of castles in Luxembourg

References

Castles in Luxembourg
Schuttrange
Educational institutions in Luxembourg